Grey is an American electronic music duo consisting of brothers Kyle and Michael Trewartha. They are best known for their debut 2016 single "Starving", with American singer Hailee Steinfeld and production work by Zedd, and "The Middle", a 2018 single in collaboration with Zedd and Maren Morris. They primarily produce music of the future bass genre.

Background
Brothers Kyle and Michael Trewartha grew up in Fountain Valley, California. Kyle played guitar in a metal band before releasing original songs and remixes in electronic genres such as dubstep and electro house under the name Singularity from 2011 to 2014. He also had two releases under the name Kyle Tree in 2015 and 2016. In 2013, Michael started to learn how to produce music.

They officially formed as Grey in 2015, first releasing a remix of "Where Are Ü Now" by Jack Ü, later remixing songs by artists including Zedd, Selena Gomez, Troye Sivan, Mike Posner and Ariana Grande. In 2016, they released their debut single "Starving" with Hailee Steinfeld and Zedd. Their debut EP, Chameleon, was released on September 29, 2017. In 2018, they released "The Middle" with Maren Morris and Zedd and signed to Island Records. They released the single "Want You Back" featuring Léon on January 10, 2019.

Discography

Extended plays

Singles

Notes

Promotional singles

Other appearances

Remixes

Songwriting and production credits

Awards and nominations

References

External links
 Official website

American musical duos
APRA Award winners
Electronic dance music duos
Electronic music groups from California
Musical groups established in 2015
Sibling musical duos
2015 establishments in California
Remixers
Future bass musicians
American pop musicians